Rostafuroxin is a digitoxigenin analog that has been shown to lower blood pressure in an animal model of hypertension. It modulates the effects of the enzyme Na+/K+-ATPase, which maintains sodium and potassium ion gradients across plasma membranes. Rostafuroxin is being studied in clinical trials for the treatment of essential hypertension.

References

3-Furyl compounds
Steroids
Antihypertensive agents
Polyols